Eleocharis keigheryi is a sedge of the family Cyperaceae that is native to Australia.

It blooms between August and November producing green flowers.

It is found in and around pools and swampy areas in the Wheatbelt and South West regions of Western Australia where it grows in sandy-loamy soils.

The species was first described in 1997 by Karen Wilson.

References

Plants described in 1997
Flora of Western Australia
keigheryi
Taxa named by Karen Louise Wilson